Suraj Singh Thakuri is a television presenter, actor, director and producer. He is currently an Chief Executive Producer in Kantipur Television Network. He is best known as the host of the longest running Nepali television talk show Call Kantipur which airs daily on Kantipur Television. After 10 years of running Call Kantipur, he handed the show over to younger talents like Suraj Giri, Akesha Bista and Riju Shrestha. He has directed several music videos, also appearing in some.

Education
Suraj attended Adarsha Vidya Mandir, Lalitpur, Nepal and completed college at Xavier Academy science college (NEF). He has a master's degree in Environmental Science. He is a sports enthusiast and has played cricket at national levels.

Personal life
He is married to Reshma Amatya back in 2007. Giving an interview to wave magazine, he said "...I had feelings for her since childhood and always believed that she is the one for me." They have a daughter, Sanbriti. 
He resides in Baneshwor.

Professional career
Call Kantipur was the first show that made him recognized. He launched his show with a co-host, Prasidika, who was later replaced by Miss Nepal Preity Sitoula. She was then replaced by another Miss Nepal, Malvika Subba. He then shared the show with VJ/RJ Manavi Dhakal. He has always considered Bhusan Dahal as his role model.

Along with Call Kantipur, he has several other shows aired on KTV. He has produced shows like KTV Tiffin Box, Arrival, Kantipur Aja, Ghum Gham, Ghum Gham with Bhushan Dahal, KTV countdown, KTV Cook Book, and Pariwartan and has also directed a number of music videos.

He left Call Kantipur and started another show Pariwartan on the same channel at Kantipur Television. It is an interview based social show that discusses problems in society and their solutions. Unlike talk shows that deal with political issues this talk show delves deep into social issues.

He is currently hosting the fourth season of It's My Show with Suraj Singh Thakuri in Kantipur Television which is broadcast every Saturday at 9:00 PM NST.

References

Living people
Nepalese television directors
1979 births
Nepalese television presenters
Actors from Kathmandu